The 1938 All-Southwest Conference football team consists of American football players chosen by various organizations for All-Southwest Conference teams for the 1938 college football season.  The selectors for the 1938 season included the Associated Press (AP).

All Southwest selections

Backs
 Davey O'Brien, Texas Christian (AP-1 [QB]) (College Football Hall of Fame)
 Billy Patterson, Baylor (AP-1 [HB])
 Dick Todd, Texas A&M (AP-1 [HB])
 John Sparks, Texas Christian (AP-1 [FB])

Ends
 Sam Boyd, Baylor (AP-1)
 William Dewell, Southern Methodist (AP-1)

Tackles
 I. B. Hale, Texas Christian (AP-1)
 Joe Boyd, Texas A&M (AP-1)

Guards
 Forrest Kline, Texas Christian (AP-1) 
 Jack Rhodes, Texas (AP-1)

Centers
 Ki Aldrich, Texas Christian (AP-1)

Key
AP = Associated Press

See also
 1938 College Football All-America Team

References

All-Southwest Conference
All-Southwest Conference football teams